Association sportive de Pontoise-Cergy Tennis de table (commonly abbreviated AS Pontoise-Cergy TT or simply ASPCTT) is a table tennis club based in Pontoise, France. One of the top clubs in the country, it finished runner-up in the French top division Pro A three times (2009, 2010, 2013) and also reached the final of the European Champions League, the premier continental competition in Europe in 2014.

Honors
Pro A:
Runner-up: 2009, 2010, 2013
European Champions League:
Winner: 2014
Semifinalist: 2013
Quarterfinalist: 2007, 2012
ETTU Cup:
Quarterfinalist: 2006, 2011

Team

Roster
Roster for the 2013–14 season
 Tristan Flore
 Marcos Freitas
 Kristian Karlsson
 Jiang Jun Wang

Staff members
 President: Louise Adam
 Team Manager: Christian Adam
 Coach: Peter Franz
 Treasurer: Ludovic Benoit
 Press Officer: Guillaume Adam

References

External links

Table tennis clubs in France
Sports clubs established in 1927
1927 establishments in France